The Tour of Somerville is an annual, three-day series of bicycle races held in and around Somerville, New Jersey during Memorial Day weekend. The featured Memorial Day event, the Kugler-Anderson 50-mile race for professional and elite cyclists is the oldest competitive bicycle race in the country, having first been run in 1940. The event has become known as "The Kentucky Derby of Cycling" and draws international Olympians and top cyclists from around the world. It was known as the predominant cycling race in America from the 1940s through the 1980s.

History

The Tour of Somerville is the oldest major bicycle race in the United States. It was first run in 1940. The race was created by Somerville bike shop owner Fred “Pop” Kugler when his son, Furman, a past National Cycling champion and one of the country's most promising cyclists, had wanted a race closer to home. In an interview before his death in 1990, Pop recalled that “Furman wanted to sleep in his own bed for a change the night before a race, so I figured ‘why not, let’s give people something to look at.’”

The elder Kugler got the necessary licenses and sanctions from cycling officials in 1939 but the one thing he didn’t count on was a snag from the state capital. “I wanted to call it a race,” he said some years later, but New Jersey law specified that no contest of any type for wage, purse, or prize could be held on a state highway. The dilemma was that Somerville's Main Street was, and still is, state highway Route 28. The state motor vehicle commissioner at the time suggested if the race instead be called a “Tour” he would issue a permit.

The First Races
Furman Kugler won the first Tour of Somerville in 1940, which attracted a field of 117 riders from as far away as New England and the Midwest. He repeated his dominance by winning his hometown race again in 1941. Furman sat out the 1942 event and that opened the door for one of his closest friends, Carl Anderson of Clifton, New Jersey, to take top honors. The race was suspended during World War II, during which Furman was killed in Okinawa and Anderson in Belgium. Renewed in 1947, the Tour was appropriately renamed The Kugler-Anderson Memorial and has been held every Memorial Day since.

Kugler's first 1940 win for the 50-miles clocked in at 2 hours and 8 minutes while riding a fixed gear, steel bicycle with wooden rims. Given advances in bike technology and the physical evolution of competitive cyclists, recent winning times for the race have been approaching the 1 hour and 40 minute mark. The bike Kugler used to win the 1940 and 1941 races is currently encased for display in a plexi-glass monument along the race circuit near Somerville Borough Hall. For his efforts during the inaugural race, Kugler won a new bicycle valued at $75, a trophy, an oil painting and a badminton set, a far cry from the current $20,000 in total prizes, distributed in equal $10,000 purses for the top men and women finishers.

Evolving History
Once known by race organizers as an event “second only to the national championships,” past competitors have included the likes of Tour de France winner Greg LeMond and Olympic gold medal speed skater turned cyclist Eric Heiden, as well as scores of national, Olympic, and world cycling champions from throughout the world. More than a sports event, the Tour has evolved as a combined street fair, music festival, arts expo, and neighborhood lawn party all wrapped around the fast-paced, multi-lap competition through the streets of Somerville's historic downtown.

Since 1947, the race has been an annual tradition in Somerville dedicated in part to honoring American heroes and Memorial Day. According to race announcer and former Tour competitor Joe Saling, the race is such a fixture in the community that, "no one calls it the Tour of Somerville in town, it's just 'the bike race.'" Although the course through the town has changed over the years, Saling explains that the essence of the race never has. The focus of the event has always been working with the town to create a venue for a classic criterium, the kind of race that America is famous for all over the world.

Kugler-Anderson Memorial (1940) 
From its earliest beginnings, the Kugler-Anderson Memorial event has read like a who's who of North American cycling. In the 1940s and 1950s, national champions Furman Kugler, Donald Sheldon, and John Chilseko, as well as Olympians Jack Heid  and Art Longsjo, all took victories (Kugler and Sheldon, twice) and laid the foundation that would make this event a national classic. This trend continued into the 1960s, with wins by Olympians Michael Hiltner, Hans Wolf, and Jack Simes, and into the 1970s, with nationally renowned cyclists Roger Young, Ron Skarin, Rory O'Reilly, Dave Boll, Dave Ware, and William Martin, all taking wins.

Harry Naismyth Junior (1949) 
In 1949, the Harry Naismith Junior event was officially added for males age 15–17. Harry Naismith (see photo, right) was from Somerville, N.J. and became Junior National Champion in 1940. Two cyclists who won both the Harry Naismith Junior event and Kugler-Anderson Memorial event were Jackie Simes and Roger Young. Several of the winners of the Harry Naismith Junior event also won national championships during their cycling career: Jackie Simes, Bobby Fenn, Alan Grieco, Roger Young, Bruce Donaghy, Andy Weaver, Dale Stetina, Jeff Lippincott, David Brinton, Ken Christoff. Many of these riders also competed at the Olympics, Pan-American Games, and/or World Championships (Jackie Simes, Roger Young, Bruce Donaghy, Andy Weaver, Dale Stetina, David Brinton). Paul Willerton, the winner in 1987, later rode professionally with Greg Lemond in Europe.

Jaycee/John Chilseko Intermediate (1971) 
In 1971, the Jaycee/John Chilseko Intermediate event was added for males age 12–14. Chiselko, who was from Somerville, was the winner of the Kugler-Anderson Memorial in 1954 and "as a 17 year old high school senior in 1954, the youngest record winner of the Tour. He was also a junior national champion and winner of the best all-around rider in the United States two years running."

Jaycee/Alan Bell Midget (1972) 
In 1972, the Jaycee/Alan Bell Midget event was added for males and females age 9–11. Alan Bell was from Somerville, NJ, and "was a member of the 1956 and 1960 US Olympic Teams which competed in Melbourne, Australia and Rome, Italy." While Bell never won the Kugler-Anderson event at Somerville, on five occasions he "finished second in the prestigious" event.

Mildred Kugler Open (1976) 
Although women first competed in a featured race during the early 1950s, a formal effort to expand women's racing as a separate part of the Tour of Somerville did not occur until 1976, when the Mildred Kugler Open 25-mile event was added. Mildred, daughter of race founder Fred “Pop” Kugler, was herself a New Jersey state champion who won the 1940 national cycling championship in her category. Although she retired in 1942 at the early age of seventeen, she later came out of retirement and won the 1952 NJ state championship, as well as third place at the National Championships that same year.

Popularity 
In 1980, Sports Illustrated published a six-page photo feature story on the race headlined “The Somerville Whirl,” in which author Sarah Pileggi concluded: “As for the spectators, at the cost of not one penny and from the best location in the house, the sidewalks, they will be able to watch the world’s finest athletes whirring past on their delicate machines 77 separate times. Which, all things considered, surely makes Memorial Day in Somerville the greatest bargain in sport.”

Joe Saling, who was the announcer of the Tour of Somerville for many years, remembers when the race was "the most prestigious race in the country to have on your record,"  and recalls how riders felt about winning Somerville: "I remember Ron Skarin, who was on a couple of Olympic teams and multiple-time national champion, won Somerville twice in the seventies. And when he won the first time, he said that it topped anything else he’d done in his career."

Five-time winner, Laura van Gilder, summed up the prestige of this event in 2021, saying, “[n]ationally, this race was the ‘Grandaddy’ of all criterium races and one not to miss. It remains one of the oldest races in America and still has the prestige of an iconic event on the racing calendar.” 

In the past, the Tour of Somerville has been estimated to attract "up to 30,000 people each year"  with some estimates of spectator attendance being even higher. In a May 28, 1983 article, The Courier News reported that "over 40,000 thousand people are expected to line the course for the 3:15p.m., 50-mile event [Kugler-Anderson Memorial]."

21st century
Begun as a Memorial Day event only and having remained so through the 1990s, changes were made then to extend the Memorial Day event into a three-day series in order to give cyclists more opportunities to compete during the weekend. As such, this year's Tour of Somerville Cycling Series, with primary sponsorship provided by Unity Bank, will also include a number of Saturday races for USA Cycling licensed riders of various skills levels in neighboring Bound Brook, New Jersey, and a Sunday series of straight line sprint racing down Somerville's historic Main Street prior to Monday's historic Tour of Somerville.

In 2019, for the fourth consecutive year, “both men’s and women’s race participants will be competing for equal $10,000 prize lists.” The 2020 race was cancelled for the first time ever due to the COVID-19 pandemic, and the 2021 race was postponed to Labor Day, only to be later cancelled due to serious flooding in Somerville from the remnants of Hurricane Ida four days prior to the race.

Recent changes to the Tour's course have shortened the length of a lap by several blocks to move the start finish line to the heart of the town's commercial Main Street. Since 2017, promoters decided to shift crowds away from the lawn and streets surrounding the Somerset County Courthouse to a more central Main Street location. Regarding the change, Jackie Simes, former Olympian and two-time winner of the Tour, has said, “It makes racing a little more technical from the riders’ perspective, which is good. It's a harder turn to make on to Bridge Street, I remember being smack up against the curb because it funnels down in there; it's a great place to watch the race."

With the onset of other large races nationally competing for riders with Somerville on Memorial Day, Somerville has adapted to still bring a powerful field of professional and premier amateur cyclist to the Tour. As race announcer Saling concludes that in recent years, "We don't necessarily have full representation from all the pro teams, but we do attract so many individually strong racers that spectators are going to see a race where the action is non-stop. No single team is able to control the overall strategy, and it leads to a situation where David really can knock off Goliath."

Kugler-Anderson Memorial Tour

Winners

Multiple winners
Riders in italics are still active.

Wins per country

Mildred Kugler Women's Open

Winners

Multiple Winners - Women 
Riders in italics are still active.

Wins Per Country - Women

Harry Naismyth Junior (age 16-18)

Winners

Multiple Winners - Junior

Jaycee/John Chilseko Intermediate (13-15)

Winners

Multiple Winners - Intermediate

Jaycee/Alan Bell Midget (10-12)

Winners

Multiple Winners - Midget

References

External links

The Courier News (Newspapers.com)

Tourist attractions in Somerset County, New Jersey
Sports in New Jersey
Cycle races in the United States
Recurring sporting events established in 1940
1940 establishments in New Jersey
Men's road bicycle races